Sutri Parish is an administrative unit of Līvāni Municipality in the Latgale region of Latvia.

Towns, villages and settlements of Sutri Parish 
  - parish administrative center

References 

Parishes of Latvia
Līvāni Municipality
Latgale